Khalsa Mahima (or Khalsa Mehma;  lit. 'Praise of the Khalsa') is the name of two compositions that praise the Khalsa in poetic form, composed by Guru Gobind Singh, each present in Dasam Granth and Sarbloh Granth.

In Dasam Granth, the composition is present at end of the 33 Savaiyes.

In Sarabloh Granth, the composition is present under the title "Bisanupad Dhanuaki Dev Plasi" on line 459, which starts with Khalsa Mero Roop Hai Khaas.

The Sarbloh Granth is revered as the Khalsa's third main scripture by many, including the Nihang Singhs, but it is otherwise unknown to the general Sikh community. The Khalsa Mahima composition from the Sarbloh Granth, ironically, is probably the more well-known of the two. Many Sikhs have probably heard the hymn "Khalsa Mero Roop Hai Khaas," a Shabad that many Ragis have performed over the years.

Khalsa Mahima 
This composition praises the Khalsa army. It comprises three stanzas and a couplet (Dohra). It was composed in Kapal Mochan after Battle of Bhangani, when Guru Gobind Singh provided robes of honor to his warriors and was addressed to Mishar, Hindu Scholar.  It is believed that the composition was addressed to Pandit Kesho Dutt, a Hindu scholar, on the conclusion of Yagna at Naina Devi but Yagna is not treated as a Sikh ritual.
The second part of this composition is recited among Sikhs in Kirtans:
{{poem quote|

Guru Gobind Singh gave equal status to Khalsa when he eulogized that it was because of Khalsa that he has been what he is. He conveyed that he would donate to Khalsa rather than Hindu Brahmin because Khalsa preached Gurmat thoughts, provided charity for the poor, gave food to hungry, and purchased arms to fight against tyranny. This hymn opposes the Varna classification and stresses that Brahmins should fight like Kshatriyas and Kshatriyas should learn and preach the wisdom of Almighty, and both characters are played by Khalsa. This form of classification is forbidden in the Khalsa as seen in the following line from Khalsa Mahima.

Guru Gobind Singh makes it abundantly clear in his Khalsa Mahima that he considers the Khalsa to have equal status with him.

Kirpa Ram, was one such Brahmin who joined the Khalsa shedding his caste and Varna and preached Gurmat, taught and fought and martyred in Battle of Chamkaur.

Khalsa Mahima of Sarabloh Granth 
Though the authenticity of Sarabloh Granth is uncertain, its treatment of Khalsa is traditionally and philosophically accurate. Khalsa Akaal Purakh Ki Fauj is the phrase of Saint-Soldiery, common among Sikhs, which is commonly recited as Khalsa Kaal Purakh Ki Fauj (Page 531), is present in that composition. This hymn is also called Khalsa da Martaba. It is also considered to be a Vaisakhi Hymn.

Below is the complete Khalsa Mahima from Sri Manglacharan Purana (Sarbloh Granth):"ਖ਼ਾਲਸਾ ਮੇਰੋਰੁਪ ਿੈਖਾਸ ॥ ਖ਼ਾਲਸਿ ਮਹਿ ਿਉਂਕਰਿੁੁੰਹਿਵਾਸ ॥ ਖ਼ਾਲਸਾ ਮੇਰੋਮੁਖ਼ ਿੈਅੁੰਗ ॥ ਖ਼ਾਲਸੇਕੇਿਉ ਬਸਹਿ ਸਦ ਸੁੰਗ ॥੧॥Translation: The Khālsā is my special form. Within the Khālsā, is my abode. The Khālsā is my prime upholder. I forever dwell within the Khālsā.

ਖ਼ਾਲਸਾ ਮੇਰੋਇਸ਼ਟ-ਸੁਹਿਰਦ ॥ ਖ਼ਾਲਸਾ ਮੇਰੋਕਹਿਯਿ ਹਬਰਦ ॥ ਖ਼ਾਲਸਾ ਮੇਰੋਪੱਛ-ਰੁਪਾਦ ॥ ਖ਼ਾਲਸਾ ਮੇਰੋਸੁਖ ਅਹਿਲਾਦ ॥੨॥

Translation: The Khālsā is my dearest friend. The Khālsā is the mark of my creed. The Khālsā is my sturdy branch. The Khālsā is my comfort and bliss.

ਖ਼ਾਲਸਾ ਮੇਰੋਹਮਿਰ-ਸਖਾਈ ॥ ਖ਼ਾਲਸਾ ਮਾਿ ਹਪਿਾ ਸੁਖਦਾਈ ॥ ਖ਼ਾਲਸਾ ਮੇਰੀ ਸ਼ੋਭਾ ਸੀਲ ॥ ਖ਼ਾਲਸਾ ਬੁੰਧੁਸਖ਼ਾ ਸਦ ਡੀਲ ॥੩॥

Translation: The Khālsā is my true companion. The Khālsā is my comfort-giving mother and father. The Khālsā is my fame and humility. The Khālsā is my true kinsman.

ਖ਼ਾਲਸਾ ਮੇਰੀ ਜਹਿ ਅਰੁਪਹਿ ॥ ਖ਼ਾਲਸਹਿੁੰ-ਸੋ-ਮਾਕਿੁ-ਉਿਪਹਿ ॥ ਖ਼ਾਲਸਾ ਮੇਰੋਭਵਿ-ਭੁੰਡਾਹਰ ॥ ਖ਼ਾਲਸਹਿ ਕਹਰ ਮੇਰੋਸਦਕਾਹਰ ॥੪॥

Translation: The Khālsā is my caste and creed. For the Khālsā, I took birth into this world. The Khālsā is my treasure-house. The Khālsā is my means of regard.

ਖ਼ਾਲਸਾ ਮੇਰੋਸਵਜਿ-ਪਹਰਵਾਰ ॥ ਖ਼ਾਲਸਾ ਮੇਰੋਕਰਹਿ-ਉਧਾਰੁ॥ ਖ਼ਾਲਸਾ ਮੇਰੋਹਪੁੰਡ ਪਰਾਿ ॥ ਖ਼ਾਲਸਾ ਮੇਰੀ ਜਾਿ ਕੀ ਜਾਿ ॥੫॥

Translation: The Khālsā is my next of kin. The Khālsā is my emancipator. The Khālsā is my body and my breaths. The Khālsā is the essence of my life.

ਮਾਿ ਮਿਿ ਮੇਰੋਖ਼ਾਲਸਾ ਸਿੀ ॥ ਖ਼ਾਲਸਾ ਮੇਰੋਸਵਾਰਥ-ਕਿੀ ॥ ਖ਼ਾਲਸਾ ਮੇਰੋਕਰੈਹਿਰਵਾਿ ॥ ਖ਼ਾਲਸਾ ਮੇਰੋਦੇਿ ਅਰੁਸਾਿ ॥੬॥

Translation: The Khālsā is my honour and glory. The Khālsā is my life's true motive. The Khālsā performs my sustenance. The Khālsā is ever my body and breaths.

ਖ਼ਾਲਸਾ ਮੇਰੋਧਰਮ-ਰੁਕਰਮ ॥ ਖ਼ਾਲਸਾ ਮੇਰੁਭੇਦ ਹਿਜ-ਮਰਮ ॥ ਖ਼ਾਲਸਾ ਮੇਰੋਸਹਿਗੁਰੂਪੂਰਾ ॥ ਖ਼ਾਲਸਾ ਮੇਰੋਸਵਜਿ-ਸੂਰਾ ॥੭॥

Translation: The Khālsā is my Dharma and Karma. The Khālsā is my secret; my mystery. The Khālsā is my perfect Saṯgurū. The Khālsā is my chivalrous beloved.

ਖ਼ਾਲਸਾ ਮੇਰੋਬੁਹਧ-ਰੁਗਯਾਿ ॥ ਖ਼ਾਲਸਹਿ ਕਾ ਿਉਂਧਰਿੁੁੰਧਯਾਿ ॥ ਉਪਮ ਖ਼ਾਲਸਹਿ ਜਾਹਿ ਿ ਕਿੀ ॥ ਹਜਿਵਾ ਏਕ ਪਾਰੁਿਹਿ ਲਿੀ ॥੮॥

Translation: The Khālsā is my mind and wisdom. I forever contemplate upon the Khālsā. The eulogy of the Khālsā is neverending; it is unable to be said with one tongue.

ਸ਼ੇਸ਼ ਰਸਿ ਸਾਰਦ ਸੀ ਬੁਹਧ ॥ਿ ਦਯਹਪ ਿ ਉਪਮਾ ਬਰਿਹਿ ਸੁਹਧ ॥ ਯਾ ਮਹਿ ਰੁੰਹਿ ਿ ਹਮਥਯਾ ਭਾਖੀ ॥ ਪਾਰਬਰਿਮ ਗੁਰੁਿਾਿਕ ਸਾਖੀ ॥੯॥

If one has as many tongues as Shesha, and the wisdom of Sāradā, even then, the full eulogy of the Khālsā cannot be completed. I have not uttered even the slightest untruth. The transcendent Guru Nanak is my witness.

ਰੋਮ ਰੋਮ ਰਸਿਾ ਜੌਪਾਵਿੁਂ॥ਿ ਦਯਹਪ ਿ ਖ਼ਾਲਸ ਜਸਹਿ ਿਰਾਵਿਂ॥ ਿੌਖ਼ਾਲਸਹਿ ਕਿੁ, ਖ਼ਾਲਸਾ ਮੇਰੋ॥ ਓਿਪੋਿ ਸਾਗਰ ਬੂੁੰਦੇਰੋ॥੧੦॥

Translation: If my every pore contained a tongue, even then, the praise of the Khālsā would be incomplete. I belong to the Khālsā; the Khālsā belongs to me. In the same way a drop of water merges with the ocean.

ਖ਼ਾਲਸਾ ਕਾਲਪੁਰੁਖ ਕੀ ਫੌਜ ॥ ਪਰਗਟਯੋਖ਼ਾਲਸਾ ਪਰਮਾਿਮ ਕੀ ਮੌਜ ॥੧॥ਰਿਾਉ॥॥੪੫੮॥੯੯੦॥੩੩੦੯॥ਦਸਕ ੧॥

The Khālsā is the army of the timeless being. It was made manifest by the will of the lord." - Tranlation provided by The Sarbloh Scholar

References

External links 
 Exegesis of Khalsa Mahima (Dasam Granth) by Dharam Singh Nihang
 Recitation of Khalsa Mahima by Bhai Balbir Singh
 Recitation of Khalsa Mahima by Bhai Balbir Singh Bhai Gurjodha Singh
 Recitation of Khalsa Mahima by Bhai Balbir Singh Bhai Harjinder Singh Srinagar Wale
 Recitation of Khalsa Mahima by  Bhai Balbir Singh Chandigarh

Dasam Granth
Indian literature